Sagit may refer to:
 Sagit (cycling team), Italian professional cycling team

People with the given name Sagit
 Sagit Agish (1904-1973), Bashkir Russian poet
 Sagit Zluf Namir (born 1978), Israeli photographer

See also

 Sagat (disambiguation)
 Saget, surname
 Sagot (disambiguation)

 Sagitta (disambiguation)
 Sagittarius (disambiguation)